Pingasa hypoleucaria is a species of moth of the family Geometridae first described by Achille Guenée in 1862. It is found on Réunion and Mauritius.

Subspecies
Pingasa hypoleucaria hypoleucaria (La Réunion)
Pingasa hypoleucaria rhodozona de Joannis, 1932 (Mauritius)

See also
 List of moths of Réunion
 List of moths of Mauritius

References

External links
 Dr.Legrain - Pictures of Pingasa hypoleucaria

Pseudoterpnini
Moths of Mauritius
Moths of Réunion
Moths described in 1862
Taxa named by Achille Guenée